Wasteland Discotheque is Danish band Raunchy's fourth album. It was released on 30 June 2008.

Track listing

Videography

Personnel 
 Kasper Thomsen – Vocals
 Jesper Tilsted – Guitars, Keyboards
 Lars Christensen – Guitars
 Jeppe Christensen – Keyboards, Vocals
 Jesper Kvist – Bass
 Morten Toft Hansen – Drums

Notes
It is officially known that "A Heavy Burden" features Raunchy's former singer, Lars Vognstrup, who left the band after Confusion Bay. 
"Somebody's Watching Me" is a cover of 1980s pop-artist Rockwell. 

2008 albums
Raunchy (band) albums